Bence Bánhidi (born 9 February 1995) is a Hungarian handballer for SC Pick Szeged and the Hungarian national team.

He represented Hungary at the 2019 World Men's Handball Championship.

Individual awards
 Hungarian Junior Handballer of the Year: 2014, 2015
 Hungarian Handballer of the Year: 2019, 2020, 2021
 All-Star Team Best Line Player of the European Championship: 2020
 All-Star Team Best Line Player of the EHF Champions League: 2020

References

External links

Oregfiuk.hu 
Balatonfuredikc.hu

Hungarian male handball players
Living people
1995 births
Sportspeople from Győr
SC Pick Szeged players